Sarychev or Sarichef is a Russian masculine surname, its feminine counterpart is Sarycheva. It may refer to

Gavril Sarychev (1763–1831), Russian navigator and hydrographer
Gennadi Sarychev (born 1938), Russian football player
Kirill Sarychev (born 1989), Russian powerlifter
Tatyana Sarycheva (born 1949), Russian volleyball player
Valeri Sarychev (born 1960), Russian-Tajikistan-South Korean football goalkeeper

Russian-language surnames